Ihor Anatoliyovych Nakonechnyi (born 23 February 1960) is a retired Ukrainian football player and coach. He played with different Soviet and Ukrainian clubs.

External links
  Profile on football.odessa.ua
  

1960 births
Living people
Footballers from Kyiv
Association football midfielders
Ukrainian footballers
Soviet footballers
FC Chornomorets Odesa players
SKA Kiev players
FC Metalurh Zaporizhzhia players
SC Odesa players
Íþróttabandalag Vestmannaeyja players
FC SKA-Lotto Odesa players
FC Viktor Zaporizhzhia players
Ukrainian expatriate footballers
Expatriate footballers in Iceland
Ukrainian Premier League players
Ukrainian football managers
FC Chornomorets Odesa managers
FC Chornomorets-2 Odesa managers
SC Odesa managers
Expatriate football managers in Moldova
Expatriate football managers in Azerbaijan
FC Sheriff Tiraspol managers
FC Tiraspol managers
Ukrainian expatriate football managers
Ukrainian expatriate sportspeople in Moldova
Ukrainian expatriate sportspeople in Azerbaijan
Ukrainian expatriate sportspeople in Iceland
Ukrainian Premier League managers
Moldovan Super Liga managers